Val Brembilla is a comune in the province of Bergamo, in Lombardy. It was established by the regional council on 4 February 2014 from the fusion of the comuni di Brembilla and Gerosa. A referendum to create this comune was held on 1 December 2013. The referendum was passed with 77% yes and 23% no votes. The first municipal elections were held on 25 May 2014.

References

Cities and towns in Lombardy